Sara Högnadóttir (born 12 November 1995) is an Icelandic badminton player. In 2015, she competed at the Baku, European Games in women's singles event. In 2014 she finished second, along with Margrét Jóhannsdóttir, in women's doubles at the Iceland International.

Achievements

BWF International Challenge/Series 
Women's doubles

  BWF International Challenge tournament
  BWF International Series tournament
  BWF Future Series tournament

References

External links 
 

1995 births
Living people
Sara Hognadottir
Sara Hognadottir
Sara Hognadottir
Badminton players at the 2015 European Games